Lakselvbukt is a village in Tromsø Municipality in Troms og Finnmark county, Norway. The village is located on the inner part of the Ullsfjorden.

Lakselvbukt Church is located in the village.

References

Villages in Troms
Tromsø